Shaking the dust from the feet was a practice of pious Jews during New Testament times.  When Jesus called his twelve disciples, he told them to perform the same act against the non-believing Jews.

In the early Latter Day Saint movement of the 19th century, it was practiced much as recorded in the New Testament, but later fell out of use. Other Christian groups and organizations typically do not see this as a practice that should be followed, or as something not to be taken literally.

New Testament
In Biblical times, when leaving Gentile cities, pious Jews often shook the dust from their feet to show their separation from Gentile practices.If the disciples shook the dust of a Jewish town from their feet, it would show their separation from Jews who rejected their Messiah. The gesture was to show the people that they were making a wrong choice; the opportunity to choose Christ might not present itself again. According to the New Testament, when Jesus called his twelve disciples, he sent them into Jewish lands and told them, in a reversal, to perform the same act against the non-believing Jews, and "it shall be more tolerable for the land of Sodom and Gomorrha in the day of judgment, than for that city". The only recorded instance of this practice in the New Testament was when Paul the Apostle and Barnabas were expelled from Antioch, Pisidia by Jews who disapproved of them teaching to Gentiles.

Latter Day Saint movement

Reintroduction
In July 1830, Joseph Smith, founder of the Latter Day Saint movement, dictated his first revelation referencing the practice, said to be the words of Jesus directed to Smith and Oliver Cowdery, directing them as follows:

And in whatsoever place ye shall enter, and they receive you not, in my name ye shall leave a cursing instead of a blessing, by casting off the dust of your feet against them as a testimony, and cleansing your feet by the wayside.

In 1831, a revelation clarified that when leaving a cursing upon a person in this way, the shaking of dust and washing of feet should be performed "not in their presence, lest thou provoke them, but in secret."

On January 25, 1832, one of Smith's revelations directed several missionaries to use the practice, and indicated that when performed against a house, the missionaries:

shall be filled with joy and gladness and know this, that in the day of judgment you shall be judges of that house, and condemn them, and it shall be more tolerable for the heathen in the day of judgment, than for that house.

After referring again to the practice in an August 29, 1832, revelation, Smith gave his final revelation on the subject on September 22–23, 1832. This revelation, directed to those ordained to the newly established high priesthood, indicated that when a person does not receive a traveling high priest, or give them food, clothing, or money, they should

go away from him alone by yourselves, and cleanse your feet, even with water, pure water, whether in heat or in cold, and bear testimony of it unto your Father, and return not again unto that man. And in whatsoever village or city ye enter, do likewise.

Early practice
The first recorded practice of shaking the dust from the feet was by Smith's brother Samuel H. Smith, who performed the act on June 30, 1830, a few days or weeks before Smith's first revelation on the subject. After Smith's revelations, the practice became fairly common. Below is a table with some of the known instances of Latter Day Saint missionaries shaking the dust off their feet during Smith's lifetime:

In The Church of Jesus Christ of Latter-day Saints
The Church of Jesus Christ of Latter-day Saints (LDS Church) continued the practice of shaking the dust off feet throughout the 19th century. Most notably, it was performed on January 19, 1881, by the First Presidency and Quorum of the Twelve Apostles against a list of 400 people considered "Enemies of the Kingdom of God" because of their activism against Mormon polygamy. In 1899, however, the First Presidency issued a direction to mission presidents to stop using it as a routine practice, but only where there is just cause and when moved by the Holy Spirit.

In 1915, the influential apostle James E. Talmage provided his opinion that the practice should occur only in "unusual and extreme conditions":

To ceremonially shake the dust from one's feet as a testimony against another was understood by the Jews to symbolize a cessation of fellowship and a renunciation of all responsibility for consequences that might follow. It became an ordinance of accusation and testimony by the Lord's instructions to His apostles as cited in the text [of the New Testament]. In the current dispensation, the Lord has similarly directed His authorized servants to so testify against those who wilfully and maliciously oppose the truth when authoritatively presented (see Doctrine and Covenants 24:15; 60:15; 75:20; 84:92; 99:4). The responsibility of testifying before the Lord by this accusing symbol is so great that the means may be employed only under unusual and extreme conditions, as the Spirit of the Lord may direct.

Since the early-20th century, the practice has been rare. Nevertheless, there have been further doctrinal developments by LDS Church leaders and scholars. According to J. Reuben Clark, a mid-century member of the First Presidency, the ritual of shaking the dust off one's feet is a manifestation of a priesthood holder's "power to determine whether sins should be forgiven, or retained"

Other Christians
Other Christian groups and individuals have taken the concept of shaking the dust from the feet as a practice to be followed. Others feel the message was only for New Testament people, and should not be practiced literally.

The 16th-century prophet Justus Velsius practiced the ritual when he was expelled from Heidelberg at the orders of Kurfürst Friedrich III.

In a rebuke for claims that Christians have persecuted the Jews, Martin Luther said "let us follow the advice of Christ and shake the dust from our shoes, and say, 'We are innocent of your blood.'"

See also
Foot washing
Ritual purification

Notes

References

.
.
.

1830 establishments in New York (state)
1830 in Christianity
Biblical phrases
Foot
Latter Day Saint ordinances, rituals, and symbolism
Metaphors referring to body parts
Christian symbols